Rdzawa  is a village in the administrative district of Gmina Trzciana, within Bochnia County, Lesser Poland Voivodeship, in southern Poland.

The village has a population of 230.

References

Rdzawa